Juniata High School is a small, rural, public high school which is one of two high schools operated by the Juniata County School District. The students reside in the central and western portions of Juniata County in central Pennsylvania. The campus is located centrally in the county in Milford Township and is shared with the school's sole feeder school, Tuscarora Junior High School. Juniata High School provides grades 9th through 12th. In the 2016–2017 school year, it had 587 students.

Extracurriculars
The Juniata County School District offers a wide variety of clubs, activities and sports at Juniata High School. The School offers: FFA, band and chorus, as well as Honor Society.

Athletics
Juniata High School participates in PIAA District VI  and the Tri-Valley League.
 Baseball
 Basketball
 Cross Country 
 Field Hockey - Co-op with East Juniata Junior/Senior High School (PIAA District IV)
 Football
 Golf - Co-op with East Juniata High School (PIAA District IV)
 Soccer
 Softball
 Tennis
 Track and Field
 Volleyball
 Wrestling

References

Education in Juniata County, Pennsylvania
Juniata County, Pennsylvania
Public high schools in Pennsylvania